"Human Moments in WWIII" is a science fiction short story by American writer Don DeLillo, originally published in a 1983 issue of Esquire Magazine and later incorporated into his published short story collection The Angel Esmeralda. It revolves around two astronauts, whose interactions are described while orbiting above an Earth torn apart by armed conflicts (hence the title) of ambiguous origin.

Plot summary

The narrative begins as a first person narrator describes his companion, named Vollmer, as they orbit above a war-torn Earth. The primary goal of their mission is to collect information and monitor enemy satellites, which he and Vollmer must report back to Colorado Command. The narrator also reveals that, while this is his third orbital mission, it is Vollmer's first. He believes that having been in space for so long, and therefore gaining a different perspective on the planet, has changed Vollmer. The narrator acknowledges that the same changes have occurred in him, and that they are likely impossible to avoid - describing the experience of orbiting the Earth as a 'privileged vista', he admits that one cannot help but gain a universal feeling and in turn dwell on the human condition.

Vollmer is described as 23 years old, and having many personal effects. The narrator, on the other hand, only carries a 1901 vintage coin. He ponders whether Vollmer's parents imparted so many possessions on him for the journey out of fear that the orbital mission would lack 'human moments', which the narrator uses as a jumping off point to describe activities and things aboard that characterize the aforementioned term. The hammocks, shipboard diet, slippers, and football jerseys are all items and practices which the narrator uses to exemplify this. While contrasting their routine on the mission with the routine of a typical Sunday back home on Earth, they are forced to inspect potential laser activity in an orbital section code-named "Dolores".

While doing this, the narrator thinks about how, despite having been pulled from the natural waking/sleeping rhythm of day and night on Earth, Vollmer still speaks within its terms. It is at this point that the narrator also reveals how Vollmer seems to annoy him on a fundamental level, describing Vollmer's voice as 'stupid' and a 'grave, naked bass'. When Vollmer tries to start conversations about wide-spanning or deep subject matter, he attempts to redirect the conversation to something more mundane or routine. Through their conversations, it is revealed that the war has only been going on for three weeks. Vollmer senses that there is a lack of satisfaction, a fatigue with the war on Earth, and this is what unnerves the narrator more than anything else: while he does not share such opinions out loud, Vollmer's convictions about society and their situation are often the same as his. Unlike Vollmer, the narrator chooses to not share such thoughts out of fear.

The narrator then begins a stream of consciousness regarding the nature of war, which he harkens to a form of longing in itself, a 'human moment'. His further conversations with Vollmer after docking for supplies elaborate this idea, as Vollmer describes the ideal that war should be a unifying force, giving a group of people a common sense of destiny; the narrator then poses the question of what happens when such a shared crisis dwindles sooner than anyone could have thought, reflecting once again his underlying fear of Vollmer's ideas.

While receiving transmissions from Colorado Command, a faint, strangely familiar signal punctures the communications and sends the narrator into another series of self-reflecting thoughts. Colorado Command assures the narrator that it's probably just 'selective noise', but the narrator insists that he has heard a voice. Colorado Command claims it's a weather report from another component of their geosynchronous orbital systems, and the narrator is advised to disregard it.

Ten hours later, Vollmer hears not just one, but multiple voices through the signal, and manages to identify vague references as well as the sound of human laughter coming through his headset. The narrator realizes that these are shows, interviews, music, and ads - radio signals from decades prior to their time period. The narrator then observes landmasses on the surface below, listing them off aloud. Vollmer remarks that the best thing science does is "name the features of the world," which sends the narrator into a spiral of thoughts regarding his fear of Vollmer's 'human' insights. As the narrator is a self-admitted specialist (actually meaning someone who doesn't specialize in a given field in Colorado Command's context), he doesn't have the specific knowledge or degrees that Vollmer does, which makes him more frustrated when Vollmer indulges in non-scientific wonderment at the Earth instead of sticking to his routine system checks. When Vollmer proclaims, "I'm happy," the narrator fills with rage, wondering how someone could possibly be happy in their situation. The narrator's bleak view of the human condition has worn out his sense of optimism, something that Vollmer's absolute feelings of well-being only intensify for him.

As the narrator describes laser technology, along with its clean lethality, he asserts that the reason two men (in this case Vollmer and himself) are tasked with the job of operating one must come from this horror at the destructive technology that man has created. As he phrases it, "Fear of the power of light, pure stuff of the universe." Now Vollmer and the narrator sit at their respective control panels, which are placed back-to-back with one another (a means of ensuring that the tics or anxieties of one man do not inhibit the decision-making of the other). As the two men count down to fire, thoughts of devastation and horror on Earth cross the narrator's mind. Within the same cycle of thoughts, however, is a sense of satisfaction for the narrator at having a life based around a series of specific steps and commands. He wonders if this sense of pleasure is almost an independent being unto itself, and confesses that such pleasure is a source of shame for him.

While preparing to fire, Vollmer asks the narrator if he has ever experienced a sense of well-being so powerful that it became a sort of blissful arrogance, a sense of superiority over others simply felt through one's life energy. Non-verbally, the narrator admits that he has felt such emotions. Vollmer continues by describing the fragility of such a feeling, that if one thing goes wrong humans can be reduced to a sense of despair and hopelessness (the narrator again agrees silently). Their station then floats over the Missouri River towards the lakes of Minnesota. Vollmer is filled with excitement (Minnesota being his home), and begins poring over the maps trying to confirm. He also talks at great length about his childhood memories, as the narrator thinks to himself that Minnesota is yet another 'human moment'. They continue to listen to the ghost signals of old radio programs as they prepare to make a quantum burn.

Vollmer observes the variety of harsh climates and weather patterns on the surface and wonders how humans can persevere and survive under such harsh conditions. The narrator thinks about how, when Vollmer forgets the war, he himself becomes a 'human moment'. The narrator is then pulled out of his trance upon remembering that, now in a time of war, there is no place for such human moments to occur. The absolution of meaning through death in war has replaced everyday life for the two, and (as the narrator observes) is beginning to change Vollmer's outlook. Vollmer (he believes) is close to inferring that life on Earth was a unique mistake, and that we are in fact alone in the universe (once again, his thinking is a product of wartime). The narrator wonders if such an idea is true, or if humans project their attitudes about their own existence into the cosmos - in which case the spirit of a given generation is all that determines such universal assertions.

Vollmer's patience with Colorado Command begins to wane, and the narrator finds himself (despite agreeing with many of Vollmer's qualms) increasingly irritated with his companion. He wonders if it has something to do with his seniority over Vollmer, or if it is simply Vollmer's voice that is getting to him. Eventually, however, Vollmer becomes completely withdrawn and non-verbal, doing all routines and checklists at the window while gazing out over the Earth. The narrator describes how every single anxiety, desire, and philosophical debate within Vollmer has been satisfied by his place above the Earth now, ending with Vollmer saying, "It's just so interesting... the colors and all." The story leaves us with the narrator repeating the phrase in his mind.

References

External links 

 Human Moments in World War III at Granta

1983 short stories
Works by Don DeLillo